Patara may refer to the following places and jurisdictions:

Artsakh 
 Patara, Nagorno-Karabakh, a village in the Askeran Province of the Republic of Artsakh

Asian Turkey 
 Patara (Cappadocia), an ancient city in Turkey
 Patara (Lycia), an ancient city and former bishopric, now a Latin Catholic titular see

India 
 Patara, Jalandhar, a village in Punjab
 Patara, Kanpur, a village in Uttar Pradesh